Hymeniacidon is a genus of sea sponges in the class Demospongiae. Some members of the genus are known to be mobile, achieving speeds of between 1 and 4 mm per day.

Species
The following species are recognised in the genus Hymeniacidon:

Hymeniacidon actites (Ristau, 1978)
Hymeniacidon addreissiformis Dickinson, 1945
Hymeniacidon agminata Ridley, 1884
Hymeniacidon assimilis Levinsen, 1887
Hymeniacidon atlantica Burton, 1948
Hymeniacidon burtoni Van Soest & Hooper, 2020
Hymeniacidon caerula Pulitzer-Finali, 1986
Hymeniacidon calcifera Row, 1911
Hymeniacidon calva (Ridley, 1881)
Hymeniacidon centrotyla Hentschel, 1914
Hymeniacidon chloris de Laubenfels, 1950
Hymeniacidon conica (Kirk, 1909)
Hymeniacidon corticata (Thiele, 1905)
Hymeniacidon digitata (Hansen, 1885)
Hymeniacidon dubia Burton, 1932
Hymeniacidon dystacta de Laubenfels, 1954
Hymeniacidon fallax Bowerbank, 1886
Hymeniacidon fasciculata (Fristedt, 1887)
Hymeniacidon fernandezi Thiele, 1905
Hymeniacidon flaccida Pulitzer-Finali, 1996
Hymeniacidon flavia Sim & Lee, 2003
Hymeniacidon fristedti (Topsent, 1913)
Hymeniacidon glabrata Burton, 1954
Hymeniacidon gracilis (Hentschel, 1912)
Hymeniacidon halichondroides (Thiele, 1898)
Hymeniacidon heliophila Parker, 1910
Hymeniacidon hentscheli Fernandez, Bravo-Gómez, Cárdenas & Hajdu, 2020
Hymeniacidon iberica (Ferrer-Hernandez, 1914)
Hymeniacidon informis (Burton, 1913)
Hymeniacidon insutus Koltun, 1964
Hymeniacidon kerguelensis Hentschel, 1914
Hymeniacidon kitchingi (Burton, 1935)
Hymeniacidon longistylus Desqueyroux, 1972
Hymeniacidon luxurians (Lieberkuhn, 1859)
Hymeniacidon mixta (Sara, 1958)
Hymeniacidon ovalae Tanita & Hoshino, 1989
Hymeniacidon perlevis (Montagu, 1818) crumb-of-bread sponge
Hymeniacidon petrosioides Dendy, 1905
Hymeniacidon plumigera Bowerbank, 1874
Hymeniacidon proteus (Ridley, 1884)
Hymeniacidon racemosa Brondsted, 1924
Hymeniacidon reptans (Cuartas, 1991)
Hymeniacidon rigida Dendy, 1897
Hymeniacidon rubiginosa Thiele, 1905
Hymeniacidon rugosa (Schmidt, 1868)
Hymeniacidon simplex (Bowerbank, 1866)
Hymeniacidon simplicima (Bowerbank, 1874)
Hymeniacidon sinapium Laubenfels, 1930
Hymeniacidon sphaerodigitata Bergquist, 1970
Hymeniacidon stylifera (Stephens, 1915)
Hymeniacidon sublittoralis Samaai & Gibbons, 2005
Hymeniacidon timonovi (Rezvoi, 1931)
Hymeniacidon torquata Topsent, 1916
Hymeniacidon ungodon de Laubenfels, 1932
Hymeniacidon upaonassu Fortunato, Pérez & Lôbo-Hajdu, 2020
Hymeniacidon variospiculata Dendy, 1922
Hymeniacidon zosterae Row, 1911

References

External links

Halichondrida
Sponge genera
Taxa named by James Scott Bowerbank